Guliso is one of the Towns in the West Oromia. It is located in West Welega Zone. Guliso town is the administrative center of Guliso district.

Demographics 
The 2007 national census reported a total population for this Aanaa  of 69,856 in 13,738 households, of whom 34,795 were men and 35,061 were women; 7,867 or 11.26% of its population were urban dwellers. The majority of the inhabitants observed Protestantism, with 88.64% reporting that as their religion, while 6.83% observed Ethiopian Orthodox Christianity and 3.69% were Muslim.

Notes 

Districts of Oromia Region